The Convention for the Protection of the Marine Environment of the North-East Atlantic or OSPAR Convention is the current legislative instrument regulating international cooperation on environmental protection in the North-East Atlantic. Work carried out under the convention is managed by the OSPAR Commission, which is made up of representatives of the Governments of the 15 signatory nations, and representatives of the European Commission, representing the European Union.

The OSPAR Convention was concluded at Paris on 22 September 1992.  It combines and up-dates the 1972 Oslo Convention on dumping waste at sea and the 1974 Paris Convention on land-based sources of marine pollution.  The name is likewise a combination of "Oslo" and "Paris".

History
The Convention for the Protection of the Marine Environment of the North-East Atlantic was opened for signature at the Ministerial Meeting of the Oslo and Paris Commissions in Paris on 22 September 1992. The Convention has been signed and ratified by all of the Contracting Parties to the original Oslo or Paris Conventions (Belgium, Denmark, the European Community, Finland, France, Germany, Iceland, Ireland, the Netherlands, Norway, Portugal, Spain, Sweden and the United Kingdom of Great Britain and Northern Ireland) and by Luxembourg and Switzerland. The OSPAR Convention entered into force on 25 March 1998, and replaced the Oslo and Paris Conventions, but decisions and other agreements adopted under those conventions remained applicable unless they are terminated by new measures adopted under the OSPAR Convention.

The first Ministerial Meeting of the OSPAR Commission at Sintra, Portugal, in 1998 adopted Annex V to the Convention, extending the cooperation of the signatory parties to cover "all human activities that might adversely affect the marine environment of the North East Atlantic". Nevertheless, programmes and measures cannot be adopted under the Convention on questions relating to fisheries management, which are currently coordinated by European nations in the north east Atlantic and North Sea by the International Council for the Exploration of the Sea (ICES). The OSPAR convention now regulates European standards on marine biodiversity, eutrophication, the release of hazardous and radioactive substances into the seas, the offshore oil and gas industry and baseline monitoring of environmental conditions.

In 2000, the OSPAR Commission published a comprehensive report on the quality of the marine environment of the North-East Atlantic. This was supported by five smaller reports on the different parts of the OSPAR maritime area –the Arctic, the Greater North Sea, the Celtic Seas, the Bay of Biscay/Golfe de Gascogne and Iberian waters, and the Wider Atlantic.

According to the :fr :Association pour le contrôle de la radioactivité dans l'Ouest, if tritium and iodine 129 discharges from the La Hague site into the Alderney Race do not diminish significantly, it will be difficult to achieve the objective of zero radioelement concentrations in the North Atlantic by 2020.

In June 2007, OSPAR signatory parties agreed to amend the Convention in order to make mandatory the application of the treaty in the case of geological storage of CO2. The treaty allows carbon capture and storage of carbonic anhydride from land to an offshore marine site through a pipeline that is not required to pass near offshore platforms for oil and gas exploration.

See also
 Convention for the Prevention of Marine Pollution by Dumping from Ships and Aircraft

References

External links
OSPAR Convention
Text.
Ratifications.

Waste treaties
Ocean pollution
Treaties concluded in 1992
Treaties entered into force in 1998
1998 in the environment
1992 in France
Treaties of Belgium
Treaties of Denmark
Treaties entered into by the European Union
Treaties of Finland
Treaties of France
Treaties of Germany
Treaties of Iceland
Treaties of Ireland
Treaties of Luxembourg
Treaties of the Netherlands
Treaties of Norway
Treaties of Portugal
Treaties of Spain
Treaties of Sweden
Treaties of Switzerland
Treaties of the United Kingdom
Treaties extended to the Faroe Islands
Treaties extended to Greenland
Treaties extended to the Isle of Man